Stephen Walters (born 22 May 1973) is an English actor.  A regular in British television and film, he has played a wide range and variety of character roles in both drama and comedy. Walters is most commonly associated with unpredictable, complex figures. He was nominated for a Royal Television Society Best Actor award in 2013 for his role in the Sky Arts drama Ragged and in 2023 for a Supporting Actor (Male) award for his role in the ITV drama Anne.

Career

Television
In 1989, whilst at St. Wilfrids secondary school, Walters was cast in ITV's British Children's anthology series Dramarama where he portrayed Corporal Tomkins in the series seven episode entitled "Ghost Story". Walters' second professional role was in season five of another anthology series, BBC's drama Screenplay. He was featured in Jimmy McGovern's episode Needle (1990), which was based upon the needle exchange programme and heroin epidemic in 1980s Liverpool.

After obtaining of a BTEC in Performing arts at Southport College (1990–1992), Walters went on to gain a place at the Bristol Old Vic Theatre School (1994–1996). In 1994 he starred as Joey Jackson, a poetic soul searching for the meaning of life, in Jim Morris' television film Blood on the Dole, part of the Alan Bleasdale Presents series for Channel 4. The performance garnered critical acclaim for Walters and on the advice of Bleasdale he decided to apply for drama school.

Upon completion of drama school Walters appeared as Ian Glover in Jimmy McGovern's acclaimed television drama Hillsborough (1996), based upon the Hillsborough disaster at the 1989 FA Cup Semi-finals. Hillsborough went on to win a BAFTA for best drama. His next performance was the role of Jamie Johnson on ITV's drama series Springhill (1996), though Walters did not return for the second series. In 1997 he would once again work with "Ghost Story" director Julian Jarrold in ITV's police drama Touching Evil. Walters would portray lead guest character Jack McCaffrey, a slippery cockney, in the two-part series one finale written by Paul Abbott.

Between 1998 and 2000 Walters appeared in several episodic performances such as BBC's Pie in the Sky, opposite the late Richard Griffiths, Mikey Sullivan in Jimmy McGovern's crime drama Liverpool 1, Technician Fifth Grade John McGrath in HBO's WWII miniseries Band of Brothers (based upon historian Stephen E. Ambrose's 1992 book of the same name), and Scott in the BBC drama Nice Guy Eddie.

In 2001, Walters starred as Knockoff in the BBC television production of writer Jim Cartwright's comedy Strumpet, opposite Christopher Eccleston. Directed by Danny Boyle, the film was a contrast to the dramatic work Walters had done to date. He was then cast as a series lead, in the role of prison psychiatrist Nick Vaughan, alongside Lennie James in the eight-part drama series Buried (2002). The Channel 4 series, from producer Tony Garner, was awarded the BAFTA for Best Drama.

Walters would go on to portray the guest starring role of Dylan Forbes in the premiere episode of ITV's drama Murder City (2004), directed by Sam Miller, before a turn as Lord Gilbert Gifford in the BBC's 2005 dramatic mini-series The Virgin Queen. After a two-year hiatus from television, Walters featured in BBC 3's six-part comedy series The Visit (2007), which was set in a prison waiting room. Walters portrayed Splodge Costello, a troublesome yet likeable inmate. Later that same year he played the memorable character Maddison Twatter (AKA Mad Twatter) in a three-episode stint for E4's cult smash Skins. In 2008's two-part series six finale of ITV's crime drama Wire in the Blood, Walters played serial-killer-on-the-loose James Williams. It was the second time Walters had worked with series star Robson Green, the first being ITV's 1997 drama Touching Evil. These episodes were directed by Philip John who would later direct Walters in Outlander (2014–2016). Walters would go on to play gangster Callum Rose, opposite fellow actor Stephen Graham, in BBC's 2012 production Good Cop. The series, written by Stephen Butchard and directed by Sam Miller, won the RTS award for Best Drama in 2013, though it only ran for one season. 

In the spring of 2013, Walters starred as real-life actor and activist Ricky Tomlinson in Ragged, a one-off drama for the Sky Arts Presents series, directed by comedian Johnny Vegas. The role dealt with Tomlinson's incarceration during the 1970s builders' strike. Walters was nominated for an RTS Award as Best Actor in a single drama – and garnered praise from Tomlinson – for his performance. 2013 also brought Walters lead roles in two television series. First was the comedy Great Night Out, from Jimmy Mulville's Hat Trick Productions, where Walters played Daz Taylor. Second was The Village, where he portrayed Crispin Ingham, a sadistic teacher from Derbyshire. Though a second series of The Village was commissioned, Walters was unable to reprise his role due to a scheduling conflict with filming Outlander (2014–2016). Walters also reunited with previous co-star Sean Bean in "Tracie's Story", a critically acclaimed episode of 2013's The Accused, penned by Jimmy McGovern.

Walters worked extensively with director Brian Kelly in 2014. He filmed three episodes of NBC's dramatic series Dracula, opposite Jonathan Rhys Meyers, as Hungarian detective Hackett. In a departure from the novel, the series was set in Victorian England, though it was filmed in Budapest, Hungary. Kelly then cast Walters as Simon the Sorcerer in NBC's series AD the Bible Continues, a sequel to Producers Mark Burnett and Roma Downey's miniseries The Bible (2015). The series was filmed in Morocco to preserve authenticity.

From 2014 to 2016, opposite Sam Heughan, Caitriona Balfe and Graham McTavish, Walters portrayed the featured role of Angus Mhor in the television adaptation of Diana Gabaldon's best-selling Scottish time travel novel Outlander. The expansion of Walters' Angus and Grant O'Rourke's Rupert MacKenzie is a favourite of Gabaldon's, who has described the television characters as "the 1800s' version of Laurel and Hardy". Between seasons one and two of Outlander, Walters was featured in two stylistically different shows for the BBC. The first was an appearance in two episodes of Dickensian (2015), a drama based upon the concept that author Charles Dickens' notable characters lived in the same Victorian neighbourhood. He was featured, opposite Stephen Rea's Inspector Bucket, as accused murderer Manning. Second, Walters guest starred as Borel in an episode of The Musketeers (2015), a retelling of Alexandre Dumas' classic French novel The Three Musketeers. Set in seventeenth century Paris, the series was filmed in Prague.

In early 2017, Walters appeared in two episodes of AMC's post-apocalyptic original series Into the Badlands as The Engineer, an American warlord, opposite Daniel Wu and Nick Frost. He also appeared as DCI Mark Guinness in RTS Award-winning Little Boy Blue, a four-part factual drama that was based on the murder of Rhys Jones and written for ITV by Jeff Pope. Summer 2017 saw Walters portray the role of failed rock star Johnny in Rowan Joffe's Tin Star. Already an accomplished musician, he was featured in the series both singing and playing the guitar. The production, filmed in Canada and starring Tim Roth and Christina Hendricks, has been described as a contemporary western.

During the first quarter of 2018 Walters featured as lead guest in series four of the BAFTA winning BBC crime drama Shetland. He portrayed Thomas Malone, a convicted murderer, who has his sentence overturned after twenty-three years behind bars. 2020 saw Walters return to BBC's crime pathology serial Silent Witness. The two-part episode, entitled "Seven Times" (a reference to the average number of times a woman returns to an abusive partner), focused on the pervasiveness of domestic abuse.

Filmed in late summer 2018 and released in early 2022, Walters appeared as Steve Williams in ITV's four-part factual drama, Anne, alongside actress Maxine Peake. From filmmakers World Productions, the drama, written by Liverpool author Kevin Sampson (Hillsborough Voices), centered on Anne Williams' crusade for justice after the death of her son Kevin in the Hillsborough disaster of 1989. Walters also featured as Zeppo in Apple T+'s Slow Horses, a spy series led by Gary Oldman, which was adapted for television from novelist Mick Herron's Slough House series. In February 2023, Walters guest starred as Nial Heslop on the season twelve finale of ITV's long-running crime drama Vera.

Film
Walters' first feature film was director Jake Scott's 1999 anachronistic comedy Plukett & Macleane, where he played the role of Dennis opposite Robert Carlyle. Two years later Walters would feature in several films. He would portray Kick Box Stevie in the darkly comedic film Kiss Kiss (Bang Bang), writer/director Stuart Suggs sophomore feature. From there he featured in producer Matthew Vaughn's film Mean Machine (2001), a remake of the 1974 Burt Reynolds classic starring Vinnie Jones, as unpredictable bomb expert Nitro. He then played the role of Nazi skinhead Blowfish in Ronny Yu's film The 51st State (AKA-Formula 51) opposite Samuel L Jackson and Robert Carlyle. Both characters showcased the more unpredictable, dangerous type of characters that Walters often portrays.

In 2004, Walters was directed by Matthew Vaughn in the supporting role of Shanks, opposite Daniel Craig, in the feature film Layer Cake. Vaughn, who had produced Barry Scholnick's Mean Machine, offered Walters the role. His next project was Guy Richie's 2005 crime thriller Revolver where, opposite Jason Statham, he portrayed Irish Joe. That same year saw a cameo appearance, as an Arkham Lunatic, in Christopher Nolan's acclaimed feature Batman Begins. 2007's feature film Hannibal Rising, the final installment of the Hannibal series, explored the origins of Hannibal Lecter and was Walter's next film role. He portrayed Zigmas Milko, a man of Eastern European origin, and one of Hannibal's main victims. The next year Walters appeared in science-fiction/noir film Franklyn, director Gerald McMorrow's debut, which premiered at the London Film Festival. His dual role as Bill Wasnik/Wormsnake was played opposite Bernard Hill and Ryan Philippe respectively.

For Splintered, a horror movie released to cinemas in 2010, Walters played dual roles as brothers Vincent and Gavin. This was particularly demanding as scenes with both characters were shot and edited without the use of digital effects. Powder (2011), based on Kevin Sampson's novel of the same name, featured Walters in the role of Johnny Winegums, a music journalist following an aspiring POP music group's rise to fame. The film was partially shot on location at the V festival in Suffolk. Later that year Walters featured in Age of Heroes alongside Sean Bean. The WWII drama, directed by Adrian Vitoria, highlighted the story of Ian Fleming's 30 Commando Unit who were assigned to infiltrate behind enemy lines in the Nazi controlled snowy mountains of Norway.

In 2012, Walters portrayed Gaz in the drama Kelly + Victor, based upon Niall Griffith's 2002 novel of the same name. 2018 saw the announcement that Walters would be starring in Outlander alumni Graham McTavish's directorial debut This Guest of Summer, along with Duncan Lacroix and McTavish's fellow The Hobbit alumni Adam Brown and Dean O'Gorman. The film, which tells the story of three actor friends who end up in a creepy town together, was partially funded via IndieGoGo, an online crowdfunding platform.

Other activities
In addition to his acting credits, Walters is an accomplished musician and has written/directed several short films. The first, a drama entitled Danny Boy, follows a man who must come to terms with his mother's Alzheimer's disease. Second, in conjunction with James Roach and Tom Lox, is a short film entitled I'm Not Here, which explores Charles Manson and features Walters in the lead role. Walters recently completed short film Humpty Fu*king Dumpty, an in-depth look at Merseybeat musician Tommy Quickly, which he wrote and directed. The project was funded through Kickstarter, a widely used crowdfunding platform.

Filmography

Television

Film

As director

Awards and nominations

References

External links
 
 Stephen Walters Showreel
 Stephen Walters YouTube Channel

Living people
British male film actors
British male television actors
Male actors from Liverpool
1975 births
Alumni of Bristol Old Vic Theatre School
20th-century British male actors
21st-century British male actors